Johnny Wright (born 24 November 1975) is a former professional footballer who played for Norwich City.

Born in Northern Ireland, Wright made five starts and two substitute appearances for Norwich, in a City career that stretched from 1994 to 1997. Notably, in his last three professional appearances (October to December 1996), 18 goals were scored (a 4-1 victory and 5-1 and 6-1 defeats).

Wright was capped by the Northern Ireland "B" team.

After leaving Norwich in 1997 he played non-league football for Wroxham before returning to Northern Ireland where he played for Glenavon and Ards.

Wright has subsequently built a career as a plastic bearings engineer, working at igus.

References

External links
Career information at ex-canaries.co.uk

1975 births
Living people
Association footballers from Northern Ireland
Premier League players
Norwich City F.C. players
Association football defenders
Wroxham F.C. players
Glenavon F.C. players
Ards F.C. players